Lester "Les" Lewis (November 26, 1966 – March 19, 2013) was an American television writer and producer, whose credits included sitcoms such as Flight of the Conchords, Caroline in the City and The Larry Sanders Show. He was a supervising producer and writer on The Office (U.S. version).

Career 
He was developing a musical series for the Disney Channel which was tentatively titled Madison High. He appeared at the San Diego Comic-Con in 2008 for a The Office (U.S. version) panel.

Death 

Lewis died by suicide on March 19, 2013, aged 46.

Filmography 
Written credits for The Office
 "The Deposition" (November 15, 2007) - Season 4
 "Customer Survey" (November 6, 2008) - Season 5

References

External links 
 

American male screenwriters
American television producers
1966 births
2013 suicides